The Power Glove is a controller accessory for the Nintendo Entertainment System. The Power Glove gained public attention due to its early virtual reality mechanics and significant marketing. However, its two games did not sell well, as it was not packaged with a game, and it was criticized for its imprecise and difficult-to-use controls.

Development

The Power Glove was originally released in 1989. Though it was an officially licensed product, Nintendo was not involved in the design or release of the accessory. Rather, it was designed by Samuel Cooper Davis for Abrams/Gentile Entertainment (AGE), made by Mattel in the United States and PAX in Japan. Additional development was accomplished through the efforts of Thomas G. Zimmerman and Jaron Lanier, a virtual reality pioneer responsible for codeveloping and commercializing the DataGlove, who had made a failed attempt at a similar design for Nintendo earlier.
Mattel brought in Image Design and Marketing's Hal Berger and Gary Yamron to develop the raw technology into a functional product. They designed Power Glove over the course of eight weeks. The Power Glove and DataGlove were based on Zimmerman's instrumented glove. Zimmerman built the first prototype that demonstrated finger flex measurement and hand position tracking using a pair of ultrasonic transmitters. His original prototype used optical flex sensors to measure finger bending which were replaced with less expensive carbon-based flex sensors by the AGE team.

Design and functionality

The glove has traditional NES controller buttons on the forearm as well as a program button and buttons labeled 0–9. The user presses the program button and a numbered button to input commands, such as changing the firing rate of the A and B buttons. Along with the controller, the player can perform various hand motions to control a character on-screen.

The Power Glove is based on the patented technology of the VPL Dataglove, but with many modifications that allow it to be used with modestly performing consumer hardware and sold at an affordable price. Whereas the Dataglove can detect yaw, pitch and roll, uses fiberoptic sensors to detect finger flexure, and has a resolution of 256 positions (8 bits) per finger for four fingers (the little finger is not measured to save money, and it usually follows the movement of the ring finger), the Power Glove can only detect roll, and uses sensors coated with conductive ink yielding a resolution of four positions (2 bits) per finger for four fingers. This allows the Power Glove to store all the finger flexure information in a single byte. However, it appears that the fingers actually feed an analog signal to the microprocessor on the Power Glove. The microprocessor converts the analog signal into two bits per finger.

There are two ultrasonic speakers (transmitters) in the glove and three ultrasonic microphones (receivers) around the TV monitor. The ultrasonic speakers take turns transmitting a short burst (a few pulses) of 40 kHz sound and the system measures the time it takes for the sound to reach the microphones. A triangulation calculation is performed to determine the X, Y, Z location of each of the two speakers, which specifies the yaw and roll of the hand. The only dimension it cannot calculate is the pitch of the hand, since the hand can pitch without moving the location of the two ultrasonic speakers.

Games
Two games were released with specific features for use with the Power Glove: Super Glove Ball, a faux-3D puzzle maze game; and Bad Street Brawler, a beat 'em up. Both games are playable with the standard NES controller, but include moves that can only be used with the glove. These two games are branded as part of the "Power Glove Gaming Series". Since no Power Glove-specific games ever retailed in Japan, the Power Glove was sold only as an alternative controller.

Two more games, Glove Pilot and Manipulator Glove Adventure, were announced but never released.  Another unreleased game, Tech Town or Tektown, is a virtual puzzle solving game in which the player moved a robotic hand around a deserted space station type of setting, using the glove to open doors and to pick up and use tools. It can be seen in a sneak peek in the Official Power Glove Game Players Gametape.

Games without specific support can also be played with the glove by inputting codes on the glove's keypad that set a control scheme for the glove.

Reception

The Power Glove sold nearly one million units. However, it generally received extremely poor reception, because the controls for the glove were incredibly obtuse, making it completely impractical for almost every game on the console.

In popular culture

The Power Glove is prominently shown in the Nintendo-produced film The Wizard, wielded by antagonist Lucas Barton (Jackey Vinson), whose smug boast, "I love the Power Glove. It's so bad," became an Internet meme years later.
The glove is featured in the YouTube web series, The Angry Video Game Nerd."
In Freddy's Dead: The Final Nightmare (1991), after losing his controller that was controlling Spencer, Freddy utilises his own version of the Power Glove that was grafted on his clawed glove to replace the controller while saying "Hey, you forgot the Power Glove!"
Japanese heavy metal band Seikima-II featured the Power Glove in the music video for a rerecorded version of their song "House of Wax". Where it was used by bassist Xenon Ishikawa.
In 2013, a documentary about the Power Glove, called The Power of Glove, was put into development. The film was released publicly in 2019.
American instrumental power metal/Nintendocore cover band Powerglove took their name from the accessory.
In the Regular Show episode, "Video Game Wizards", the characters enter a competition hoping to win the Maximum Glove, a parody of the Power Glove. The competition's commercial goes as far as to include the line "It's so bad", in reference to The Wizard's depiction of the glove.
In Hackers, the FBI technician is briefly shown wearing a Power Glove after seizing character Joey Pardella's computer.
In Smosh, the Teleporting Fat Guy wears a Power Glove.
In Turbo Kid, the weapon found by "the kid" closely resembles the Power Glove.
The Power Glove is worn by the character Hackerman in the film Kung Fury.
The Power Glove is featured in The Goldbergs second-season episode "A Goldberg Thanksgiving", where Adam Goldberg receives the glove as a gift from his uncle, who both share a common interest in video games.
The glove appears briefly in the music video of "Fly (Through the Starry Night)," a song by the Eurodance group 2 Brothers on the 4th Floor.
The Power Glove is briefly shown in the premiere episode of Get a Life.
In the film Commando Ninja protagonist John travels to the future using a Power Glove.
On 18 July 2019, speedrunner GrandPooBear became the first and only person known to have to completed Super Mario Bros 3 using only the Power Glove. He finished the game in 2:29:43.
A copy of Power Glove, dubbed "Retro Glove", briefly appears in the game " Infiltrating the Airship" from The Henry Stickmin Collection.
Ash's prosthetic hand in Ash vs Evil Dead is built from a repurposed Power Glove.
The Power Glove is prominently featured in the 2021 HBO Max movie 8-Bit Christmas.
The Power Glove is worn by the ninjas in the 2021 kickstarter film "Commando Ninja". It is used for time travel, camouflage and other functions.
The Power Glove can used with the Nintendo Switch to control and drive toy Mario Karts around in the Mario Kart Live: Home Circuit game.

References

Game controllers
Nintendo Entertainment System accessories
Products introduced in 1989
Virtual reality
Gesture recognition